Perrysburg is an unincorporated community in Union Township, Miami County, in the U.S. state of Indiana.

History
Perrysburg was platted in 1837 by John R. Wilkinson and Matthew Fenimore.  Two years later, Perrysburg contained a half a dozen residences, a tavern, a store, a blacksmith shop, and a church. When the Lake Erie and Western Railroad was built in Miami County, it was not extended to Perrysburg, and the town declined.

A post office was established at Perrysburg in 1838, and remained in operation until it was discontinued in 1907.

Geography

References

Unincorporated communities in Miami County, Indiana
Unincorporated communities in Indiana